E 77 is a route in the United Arab Emirates (UAE). It begins at the 7th interchange of Sheikh Zayed Road (E 11) near Jebel Ali Industrial Area, and progresses southward towards the interior town of Hatta, intersecting with the Dubai–Al Ain Highway (E 66) along the way.  E 77 eventually merges with E 44 at Al Lehbab, which leads to Hatta.

Important city landmarks and localities such as Dubai Investment Park and the soon to be built Dubai World Central International Airport are located on E 77's pathway to Lehbab.

References

Roads in the United Arab Emirates
Transport in Dubai